In crystallography, the cubic (or isometric) crystal system is a crystal system where the unit cell is in the shape of a cube. This is one of the most common and simplest shapes found in crystals and minerals.

There are three main varieties of these crystals:
Primitive cubic (abbreviated cP and alternatively called simple cubic)
Body-centered cubic (abbreviated cI or bcc)
Face-centered cubic (abbreviated cF or fcc)
Note: the term fcc is often used in synonym for the cubic close-packed or ccp structure occurring in metals. However, fcc stands for a face-centered-cubic Bravais lattice, which is not necessarily close-packed when a motif is set onto the lattice points. E.g. the diamond and the zincblende lattices are fcc but not close-packed.
Each is subdivided into other variants listed below. Although the unit cells in these crystals are conventionally taken to be cubes, the primitive unit cells often are not.

Bravais lattices

The three Bravais lattices in the cubic crystal system are:

The primitive cubic lattice (cP) consists of one lattice point on each corner of the cube; this means each simple cubic unit cell has in total one lattice point. Each atom at a lattice point is then shared equally between eight adjacent cubes, and the unit cell therefore contains in total one atom ( × 8).

The body-centered cubic lattice (cI) has one lattice point in the center of the unit cell in addition to the eight corner points. It has a net total of two lattice points per unit cell ( × 8 + 1).

The face-centered cubic lattice (cF) has lattice points on the faces of the cube, that each gives exactly one half contribution, in addition to the corner lattice points, giving a total of 4 lattice points per unit cell ( × 8 from the corners plus  × 6 from the faces).

The face-centered cubic lattice is closely related to the hexagonal close packed (hcp) system, where two systems differ only in the relative placements of their hexagonal layers. The [111] plane of a face-centered cubic lattice is a hexagonal grid.

Attempting to create a base-centered cubic lattice (i.e., putting an extra lattice point in the center of each horizontal face) results in a simple tetragonal Bravais lattice.

Coordination number (CN) is the number of nearest neighbors of a central atom in the structure. Each sphere in a cP lattice has coordination number 6, in a cI lattice 8, and in a cF lattice 12.

Atomic packing factor (APF) is the fraction of volume that is occupied by atoms. The cP lattice has an APF of about 0.524 , the cI lattice an APF of about 0.680, and the cF lattice an APF of about 0.740.

Crystal classes

The isometric crystal system class names, point groups (in Schönflies notation, Hermann–Mauguin notation, orbifold, and Coxeter notation), type, examples, international tables for crystallography space group number, and space groups are listed in the table below. There are a total 36 cubic space groups.

Other terms for hexoctahedral are: normal class, holohedral, ditesseral central class, galena type.

Single element structures

As a rule, since atoms in a solid attract each other, the more tightly packed arrangements of atoms tend to be more common. (Loosely packed arrangements do occur, though, for example if the orbital hybridization demands certain bond angles.) Accordingly, the primitive cubic structure, with especially low atomic packing factor, is rare in nature, but is found in polonium. The bcc and fcc, with their higher densities, are both quite common in nature. Examples of bcc include iron, chromium, tungsten, and niobium. Examples of fcc include aluminium, copper, gold and silver.

Another important cubic crystal structure is the diamond cubic structure, which can appear in carbon, silicon, germanium, and tin. Unlike fcc and bcc, this structure is not a lattice, since it contains multiple atoms in its primitive cell. Other cubic elemental structures include the A15 structure found in tungsten, and the extremely complicated structure of manganese.

Multi-element structures
Compounds that consist of more than one element (e.g. binary compounds) often have crystal structures based on the cubic crystal system. Some of the more common ones are listed here. These structures can be viewed as two or more interpenetrating sublattices where each sublattice occupies the interstitial sites of the others.

Caesium chloride structure

One structure is the "interpenetrating primitive cubic" structure, also called a "caesium chloride" structure. This structure is often confused for a body-centered cubic structure, because the arrangement of atoms is the same. The true structure is shown in the graphic showing two individual primitive cubic structures that are superimposed within each other with the corner of one structure in the center of the cube of the other structure.  It helps to convince yourself that it is not body-centered cubic because there is no translational symmetry along the ½, ½, ½, plane, the chloride would be translated into a cesium, not another chloride. 

It works the same way for the NaCl structure described in the next section.  If you take out the Cl atoms, the leftover Na atoms still form an FCC structure, not a simple cubic structure. 

In the unit cell of CsCl, each ion is at the center of a cube of ions of the opposite kind, so the coordination number is eight. The central cation is coordinated to 8 anions on the corners of a cube as shown, and similarly, the central anion is coordinated to 8 cations on the corners of a cube. Alternately, one could view this lattice as a simple cubic structure with a secondary atom in its cubic void.

In addition to caesium chloride itself, the structure also appears in certain other alkali halides when prepared at low temperatures or high pressures. Generally, this structure is more likely to be formed from two elements whose ions are of roughly the same size (for example, ionic radius of Cs+ = 167 pm, and Cl− = 181 pm).

The space group of the caesium chloride (CsCl) structure is called Pmm (in Hermann–Mauguin notation), or "221" (in the International Tables for Crystallography). The Strukturbericht designation is "B2".

There are nearly a hundred rare earth intermetallic compounds that crystalize in the CsCl structure, including many binary compounds of rare earths with magnesium, and with elements in groups 11, 12, and 13. Other compounds showing caesium chloride like structure are CsBr, CsI, high-temperature RbCl, AlCo, AgZn, BeCu, MgCe, RuAl and SrTl.

Rock-salt structure

The space group of the rock-salt or halite (sodium chloride) structure is denoted as Fmm (in Hermann–Mauguin notation), or "225" (in the International Tables for Crystallography). The Strukturbericht designation is "B1".

In the rock-salt  structure, each of the two atom types forms a separate face-centered cubic lattice, with the two lattices interpenetrating so as to form a 3D checkerboard pattern. The rock-salt structure has octahedral coordination: Each atom's nearest neighbors consist of six atoms of the opposite type, positioned like the six vertices of a regular octahedron. In sodium chloride there is a 1:1 ratio of sodium to chlorine atoms.  The structure can also be described as an FCC lattice of sodium with chlorine occupying each octahedral void or vice versa.

Examples of compounds with this structure include sodium chloride itself, along with almost all other alkali halides, and "many divalent metal oxides, sulfides, selenides, and tellurides". According to the radius ratio rule, this structure is more likely to be formed if the cation is somewhat smaller than the anion (a cation/anion radius ratio of 0.414 to 0.732).

The interatomic distance (distance between cation and anion, or half the unit cell length a) in some rock-salt-structure crystals are: 2.3 Å  (2.3 × 10−10 m) for NaF, 2.8 Å for NaCl, and 3.2 Å for SnTe. Most of the alkali metal hydrides and halides have the rock salt structure, though a few have the caesium chloride structure instead.

Many transition metal monoxides also have the rock salt structure (TiO, VO, CrO, MnO, FeO, CoO, NiO, CdO). The early actinoid monocarbides also have this structure (ThC, PaC, UC, NpC, PuC). Other compounds showing rock salt like structure are TiB, ZrB, PbS, PbSe, PbTe, SnTe, AgF, AgCl, and AgBr.

Fluorite structure

Much like the rock salt structure, the fluorite structure (AB2) is also an Fmm structure but has 1:2 ratio of ions. The anti-fluorite structure is nearly identical, except the positions of the anions and cations are switched in the structure. They are designated Wyckoff positions 4a and 8c whereas the rock-salt structure positions are 4a and 4b.

Zincblende structure

The space group of the Zincblende structure is called F3m (in Hermann–Mauguin notation), or 216. The Strukturbericht designation is "B3".

The Zincblende structure (also written "zinc blende") is named after the mineral zincblende (sphalerite), one form of zinc sulfide (β-ZnS). As in the rock-salt structure, the two atom types form two interpenetrating face-centered cubic lattices. However, it differs from rock-salt structure in how the two lattices are positioned relative to one another. The zincblende structure has tetrahedral coordination: Each atom's nearest neighbors consist of four atoms of the opposite type, positioned like the four vertices of a regular tetrahedron. In zinc sulfide the ratio of zinc to sulfur is 1:1. Altogether, the arrangement of atoms in zincblende structure is the same as diamond cubic structure, but with alternating types of atoms at the different lattice sites. The structure can also be described as an FCC lattice of zinc with sulfur atoms occupying half of the tetrahedral voids or vice versa.

Examples of compounds with this structure include zincblende itself, lead(II) nitrate, many compound semiconductors (such as gallium arsenide and cadmium telluride), and a wide array of other binary compounds. The boron group pnictogenides usually have a zincblende structure, though the nitrides are more common in the wurtzite structure, and their zincblende forms are less well known polymorphs.

This group is also known as the II-VI family of compounds, most of which can be made in both the zincblende (cubic) or wurtzite (hexagonal) form.

This group is also known as the III-V family of compounds.

Heusler structure

The Heusler structure, based on the structure of Cu2MnAl, is a common structure for ternary compounds involving transition metals. It has the space group Fmm (No. 225), and the Strukturbericht designation is L21. Together with the closely related half-Heusler and inverse-Huesler compounds, there are hundreds of examples.

Iron monosilicide structure

The space group of the iron monosilicide structure is P213 (No. 198), and the Strukturbericht designation is B20. This is a chiral structure, and is sometimes associated with helimagnetic properties. There are four atoms of each element for a total of eight atoms in the unit cell.

Examples occur among the transition metal silicides and germanides, as well as a few other compounds such as gallium palladide.

Weaire–Phelan structure

A Weaire–Phelan structure has Pmn (223) symmetry.

It has three orientations of stacked tetradecahedrons with pyritohedral cells in the gaps. It is found as a crystal structure in chemistry where it is usually known as a "type I clathrate structure". Gas hydrates formed by methane, propane, and carbon dioxide at low temperatures have a structure in which water molecules lie at the nodes of the Weaire–Phelan structure and are hydrogen bonded together, and the larger gas molecules are trapped in the polyhedral cages.

See also
Atomium: building which is a model of a bcc unit cell, with vertical body diagonal.
Close-packing
Dislocations
Reciprocal lattice

References

Further reading
Hurlbut, Cornelius S.; Klein, Cornelis, 1985, Manual of Mineralogy, 20th ed., Wiley,

External links
JMol simulations by Graz University:
Simple cubic 
BCC 
FCC 
HCP

Making crystal structure with Molview

Crystal systems
Cubes